John Ta Chuan Fang ( 27 May 1924 – 27 April 1992) was an American businessman, publisher, and writer based in San Francisco. He was the founder of Chinatown Handy Guide and AsianWeek.

Early life
Fang was born in Shanghai, China in 1924. He earned a bachelor's degree in journalism at Taipei's National Chengchi University and worked their for the government-controlled New Life newspaper. In 1952, he moved to San Francisco to study at UC Berkeley.

Career
Fang started out on his own by publishing the Chinatown Handy Guide in 1959, a series of  booklets to the Chinatowns in major US cities, as they were emerging as tourist attractions.

In 1979, he founded AsianWeek, and its headquarters were in San Francisco's Chinatown.

Personal life
In 1960, he married Florence Fang, and they had three sons.

Fang died on 27 April 1992.

References

1924 births
1992 deaths
20th-century American newspaper publishers (people)
Businesspeople from San Francisco
Businesspeople from Shanghai
National Chengchi University alumni
Taiwanese journalists
Taiwanese people from Shanghai
University of California, Berkeley alumni
Writers from San Francisco
20th-century journalists